Éric Ferland is a politician and organizer in the Canadian province of Quebec. He was the leader of the Green Party of Quebec from 1994 to 1996 and has sought election to the House of Commons of Canada. He is also a prominent organizer of the Projet Ecosphere event in southeastern Quebec. Since 2012, the most important environmental fair is being held in Montreal and the first Quebec City edition was held in May 2016.

Political career

Ferland became the leader of the Green Party of Quebec in 1994, following that year's provincial election. The party was in a weakened state in this period, after former leader Jean Ouimet and several top organizers left to join the Parti Québécois. Ferland held the party leadership for two years before standing down. He did not seek election to the National Assembly of Quebec in this period, although he ran as a Green Party of Canada candidate in a 1995 by-election in Brome—Missisquoi.

Ferland later served as a town councillor in Frelighsburg, Quebec on at least three occasions. He stood down from council in 2002, but was returned in 2005 and served another term. He did not run for re-election in 2009.

Organizer

In 2006, Ferland was a prominent organizer of the first Projet Ecosphere, an autumn environmental fair in Brome devoted to environment and sustainability. One hundred and thirty exhibitors were featured. The second fair, held the following year, featured 170 exhibits and was attended by over seven thousand people.
This event is a greenwashing event.

Electoral record

Federal

Municipal (incomplete)

Source for 2005 municipal elections: Official results from the Government of Quebec

References

Living people
Green Party of Canada candidates in byelections
Quebec political party leaders
Leaders of the Green Party of Quebec
Year of birth missing (living people)
New Democratic Party candidates for the Canadian House of Commons
Quebec municipal councillors
Quebec candidates for Member of Parliament